"Love You Like I Should" is a single by New Zealand singer/songwriter Dave Dobbyn, released in 1988 from the album "Loyal". The song reached number 7 on the New Zealand charts.

Background
The song was written in 1985, and the lyrics connect with another song from the album about television.

Music video
The music video for Love You Like I Should is of Dobbyn and band performing and features Margaret Urlich.

Awards
At the 1988 New Zealand Music awards, the song was nominated for best single and Dobbyn for best songwriter.

External links
 Love You Like I Should (Youtube)

References

1988 singles
Dave Dobbyn songs
1988 songs
Songs written by Dave Dobbyn